Zwei Mütter is a 1957 East German film directed by Frank Beyer and based on a screenplay by Leonie Ossowski. The film was Frank Beyer's graduation film at the Film School of the Academy of Performing Arts (FAMU) in Prague. The film tells the story of two women, one French and the other German, who fight for a child who has been mistakenly taken by the Germans after a bomb raid. The film had a theatrical release and became a popular success with more than two million tickets sold in East Germany, but was also criticized for "lack of a stance" and "bourgeois pacifism".

References

External links
 
 Zwei Mütter at Filmportal.de 

1957 films
East German films
Films directed by Frank Beyer
1957 directorial debut films
1950s German-language films
1950s German films